Timothy Sheehy (2 December 1855 – 5 November 1938) was an Irish politician. A merchant, he was first elected to Dáil Éireann as a Cumann na nGaedheal Teachta Dála (TD) for the Cork West constituency at the June 1927 general election. He was re-elected at the September 1927 general election but lost his seat at the 1932 general election.

References

1855 births
1938 deaths
Cumann na nGaedheal TDs
Members of the 5th Dáil
Members of the 6th Dáil
Politicians from County Cork
People educated at Castleknock College